Veavågen (historically Vedavågen) is an urban village in Karmøy municipality in Rogaland county, Norway. It is located on the western shore of the island of Karmøy, about halfway between the towns of Kopervik and Åkrehamn.  The Norwegian county road 854 runs through the east side of the village.  The economy of Veavågen is centered around fishing and the related fishing industries. The local sports club is named SK Vedavåg Karmøy.  Vedavågen Church was built here in 2009. Storhall Karmøy, one of the biggest athlete halls in the district was built here in 2014-2015

Since 2015, the population of the urban area of Veavågen has been included within the town of Åkrehamn and separate statistics are no longer tracked by Statistics Norway. Prior to that time it was a tettsted which is an urban area in Norway, although it has never been granted town status under Norwegian law.

The name "Veavågen" is commonly shortened to "Vea". The name originates from one of the historical farms in the area, called "Vea"

Name
For several years, road signage and the postal service used the spelling "Vedavågen" and some of the locals used the spelling "Veavågen".  On 25 November 2013, Karmøy's municipal council declared that "Veavågen" was the proper spelling.  The mailing areas associated with the village were changed to "Veavågen" effective 1 October 2014.

References

External links
 A picture taken from the Salvøy bridge
 A map of the environment

Villages in Rogaland
Karmøy